Nicolas Deschamps (born January 6, 1990) is a Canadian professional ice hockey forward. He is currently playing for Brûleurs de Loups of the Ligue Magnus. Deschamps made his professional debut in the AHL in 2009 when he appeared in two games for the Iowa Chops. He made his National Hockey League debut in the 2013–14 season with the Washington Capitals.

Playing career
Deschamps was a second round pick, 35th overall, of the Anaheim Ducks at the 2008 NHL Entry Draft.

He began his junior career in 2007–08, scoring 24 goals and 67 points in 63 games for the Chicoutimi Saguenéens. He won the Michel Bergeron Trophy as the QMJHL's offensive rookie of the year, and was named to both the QMJHL and CHL All-Rookie Teams.

After recording 65 points in 65 games for Chicoutimi in 2008–09, he was assigned to the Chops, appearing in two games before their season also ended. He began the 2009–10 QMJHL season with Chicoutimi, appearing in 31 games before he was traded to the Wildcats.

On January 3, 2012, Deschamps was traded from the Anaheim Ducks to the Toronto Maple Leafs in exchange for left winger Luca Caputi. He was directly assigned to AHL affiliate, the Toronto Marlies, and re-established his scoring presence from his rookie season to record 30 points in 40 games, to help the Marlies reach the Calder Cup finals.

During the following 2012–13 season, Deschamps was again subject to trade, when he was dealt by the Maple Leafs to the Washington Capitals in exchange for Kevin Marshall on March 14, 2013.

On July 23, 2014, Deschamps signed abroad in Finland, agreeing to a one-year deal with Liiga club, Oulun Kärpät. In the 2014–15 season, Deschamps struggled initially with Kärpät, registering just 1 goal in 8 games before he was released from his contract. On October 30, 2014, Dechamps signed a short-term contract with German Deutsche Eishockey Liga club, the Straubing Tigers. After 8 points in 11 games, Deschamps moved to the neighbouring Austrian Hockey League for his third brief stint with the Vienna Capitals before opting to return to North America. On February 5, 2015, Deschamps was claimed off AHL waivers by the Syracuse Crunch from the Lehigh Valley Phantoms. After 12 games with the Crunch, Deschamps was reassigned to the ECHL with the Florida Everblades to finish the year.

Deschamps played the 2015–16, and 2016–17 seasons with IK Oskarshamn, and the 2017–18 season with Dragons de Rouen.

Career statistics

Regular season and playoffs

International

References

External links

1990 births
Living people
Anaheim Ducks draft picks
Canadian ice hockey forwards
Chicoutimi Saguenéens (QMJHL) players
Dragons de Rouen players
Florida Everblades players
Hershey Bears players
Ice hockey people from Montreal
IK Oskarshamn players
Iowa Stars players
Moncton Wildcats players
Oulun Kärpät players
People from LaSalle, Quebec
Straubing Tigers players
Syracuse Crunch players
Toronto Marlies players
Vienna Capitals players
Washington Capitals players
Canadian expatriate ice hockey players in Austria
Canadian expatriate ice hockey players in Finland
Canadian expatriate ice hockey players in Germany